Thearubigins are polymeric polyphenols that are formed during the enzymatic oxidation and condensation of two gallocatechins (epigallocatechin and epigallocatechin gallate) with the participation of polyphenol oxidases  during the fermentation reactions  in black tea. Thearubigins are red in colour and are responsible for much of the staining effect of tea. Therefore, a black (fully oxidized) tea often appears red while a green or white tea has a much clearer appearance. The colour of a black tea, however, is affected by many other factors as well, such as the amount of theaflavins, another oxidized form of polyphenols.

Thearubigins were first studied by Roberts, E. A. H. in the 1960s by the means of spectroscopy or by fractionation or paper chromatography. They have been identified as proanthocyanidins in 1969. The thearubigins formation has been studied in an in vitro model in 1983.

Thearubigins from black tea extracts have been studied by degradation in 1996. Quantification methods were based on Porter's assay in 1995 and separation made on C18 sorbent cartridges in 1992.

Some new structures like theacitrin have been proposed in 1997 or in 2003 (theasinensins A and B). Further studies made use of MALDI-TOF mass spectrometry in 2004 and other techniques in 2010. It has been shown in 2009 that thearubigins formation in black tea is correlated with catechins depletion.

References